Philippe Bourret (born 24 April 1979) is a male badminton player from Canada.

Bourret competed in badminton at the 2004 Summer Olympics in mixed doubles with partner Denyse Julien.  They lost to Daniel Shirley and Sara Petersen of New Zealand in the round of 32.

References
sports-reference.com
tournamentsoftware.com

1979 births
Living people
French Quebecers
Sportspeople from Quebec
Canadian male badminton players
Badminton players at the 2004 Summer Olympics
Olympic badminton players of Canada
Badminton players at the 2003 Pan American Games
Pan American Games medalists in badminton
Pan American Games gold medalists for Canada
Badminton players at the 2006 Commonwealth Games
Badminton players at the 2002 Commonwealth Games
Commonwealth Games competitors for Canada
Medalists at the 2003 Pan American Games